Aston Villa played the  1934–35 English football season in the Football League First Division. This was manager Jimmy McMullan's first season having been appointed as manager when Billy Smith retired at the end of the previous season.

The new year saw Aston Villa draw 1–1 away to Derby County, Eric Houghton scoring Villa's goal, leaving the club in 12th position.

League table

Squad statistics

Appearances
Harry Morton, 43 appearances
Eric Houghton, 42 appearances
George Beeson, 41 appearances
Danny Blair, 38 appearances
Billy Kingdon, 36 appearances
Jimmy Allen, 34 appearances 
Dai Astley, 33 appearances
Tommy Gardner, 32 appearances
Arthur Cunliffe, 26 appearances
Pongo Waring, 25 appearances
Ronnie Dix 24 appearances 
Joe Beresford, 23 appearances
Jimmy Gibson, 12 appearances
Bob Brocklebank, 12 appearances
Archie Watkins, 11 appearances
Alec Talbot, 10 appearances
Reg Chester, 10 appearances
Frank Broome, 7 appearances
Tommy Mort, 5 appearances
Billy Simpson, 3 appearances
Fred Butcher, 2 appearances
Jimmy McLuckie, 1 appearances
George Brown, 1 appearances
Tommy Wood, 1 appearances
Ernie Callaghan, 1 appearances

References

Aston Villa F.C. seasons
Aston Villa F.C. season